Albania participated in the Junior Eurovision Song Contest 2016 with the song "Besoj" written by Adrian Hila and Pandi Laço. The song was performed by Klesta Quehaja. The Albanian entry for the 2016 contest in Valletta, Malta was selected through a national final organised by the Albanian broadcaster Radio Televizioni Shqiptar (RTSH). The national final consisted of fourteen competing acts participating in a televised production where the winner was determined by 100% votes of jury members made up of music professionals. Klesta Qehaja won the Festivali 52 i Këngës për Fëmijë with the song "Besoj", on 1 June 2016.

Background 

Prior to the 2016 Contest, Albania had participated in the Junior Eurovision Song Contest two times since its first entry in 2012, only opting not to participate at the 2013 and 2014 contests.

Before Junior Eurovision

National final 
The national final, Festivali 52 i Këngës për Fëmijë, took place on 1 June 2016. The national final consisted of fourteen competing acts participating in a televised production where the winner was be determined by 100% votes of jury members made up of music professionals.

Jury members 
The jury members were as follows (in alphabetical order):
 Adelina Mamaqi
 Aleksandër Lalo
 Era Rusi
 Gordon Bonello
 Irma Libohova
 Martin Leka
 Olga Salamakha

Preparation 
The video and new version of the "Besoj" were premiered on 7 November 2016.

Artist and song information

Klesta Qehaja 
Klesta Qehaja (born 18 August 2006) is a Kosovo-Albanian singer. She represented Albania with the song "Besoj", at the Junior Eurovision Song Contest 2016 in Valletta, Malta on 20 November 2016.

Prior to the Junior Eurovision Song Contest, Qehaja had participated in multiple contests such as Gjeniu i Vogël in Albania, Shining Star in Turkey, Bled Golden Microphone in Serbia, and most notably winning first prize in the Pristina Kids Fest.

Besoj 
"Besoj" (English translation: "I Believe") is a song performed by Albanian child singer Klesta Qehaja. It represented Albania during the Junior Eurovision Song Contest 2016. It is composed and written by Adrian Hila and Pandi Laço who also composed and wrote the previous Albanian entry "Dambaje".

At Junior Eurovision 
During the opening ceremony and the running order draw which took place on 14 November 2016, Albania was drawn to perform third on 20 November 2016, following Armenia and preceding Russia.

The final will be broadcast in Albania on TVSH, RTSH Muzikë and Radio Tirana with commentary by Andri Xhahu.

Final 
Klesta was wearing a white dress with a satin belt, bow in the back and lace on the edge of the dress. She stood in the middle of the stage with a microphone in her right hand and with her left hand she was making discrete movements. The backdrop shifted in black, white and red, without any other props on stage.

Voting 
During the press conference for the Junior Eurovision Song Contest 2016, held in Stockholm, the Reference Group announced several changes to the voting format for the 2016 contest. Previously, points had been awarded based on a combination of 50% National juries and 50% televoting, with one more set of points also given out by a 'Kids' Jury'. For the first time since the inauguration of the contest the voting procedure will not include a public televote. Following these results, three expert jurors will also announce their points from 1–8, 10, and 12. These professional jurors are: Christer Björkman, Mads Grimstad, and Jedward.

Annotations

References 

Albania
2016
Junior Eurovision Song Contest